Can Heironymus Merkin Ever Forget Mercy Humppe and Find True Happiness? is a 1969 British musical film directed by and starring Anthony Newley.

Plot
Merkin is an internationally successful singer approaching middle age who retells his life story in a series of production numbers on a seashore in front of his two toddlers and aged mother. Merkin's promiscuous relationships with women are explored, particularly Polyester Poontang and the adolescent Mercy Humppe. Merkin compares the relationship with Mercy Humppe to that of Humbert Humbert and Lolita.

Merkin is constantly surrounded by a Satan-like procurer, Goodtime Eddie Filth, and an angelic 'Presence' who interrupts Merkin's biography with cryptic Borscht Belt-level jokes to denote births and deaths in Merkin's life. Newley periodically steps out of character to complain about his 'Merkin' role with an unseen director, two screenwriters, the film's producers and a trio of blasé movie critics who are turned off by the story's eroticism and lack of plot.

Cast
Anthony Newley – Heironymus Merkin/Director
Joan Collins – Polyester Poontang 
Milton Berle – Goodtime Eddie Filth 
George Jessel – The Presence 
Bruce Forsyth – Uncle Limelight 
Stubby Kaye – Fat Writer 
Connie Kreski – Mercy Humppe 
Patricia Hayes – Grandma 
Victor Spinetti – Critic Sharpnose 
Ronald Radd – Critic Bentley 
Rosalind Knight – Critic Penelope 
Louis Negin – Producer Peter 
Julian Orchard – Red Cardinal 
Judy Cornwell – Filigree Fondle
Margaret Nolan - Little Assistance

Production notes
The film was shot on the island of Gozo.  The set designer for the dream sequences was Loudon Sainthill, who died shortly after finishing his work on the film.

Reception
In 1970, Newley and his co-writer Herman Raucher won the Writers' Guild of Great Britain Award for Best British Original Screenplay. The film's original music was written by Newley with lyrics by Herbert Kretzmer (Les Misérables). The film was controversial because it was X rated in its original release, meaning many newspapers in the U.S. would not take advertising for it.

The film was a commercial, and generally a critical, failure. Vincent Canby wrote in The New York Times that Newley "so over extends and overexposes himself that the movie comes to look like an act of professional suicide...The movie is as self-indulgent as a burp. It's also as pretentious as its form...The movie is not so free and loose as it is simply out of control." In The Sunday Times Guide to Movies on Television, Angela and Elkan Allan asked "Can Anthony Newley ever remember that he is just a pleasant light comedian and settle down to earn an unpretentious living?" Michael Billington of  The Illustrated London News wrote: "The kindest thing for all concerned would be that every available copy should be quietly and decently buried." Rex Reed also savaged it: "If I'd been Anthony Newley I would have opened it in Siberia during Christmas week and called it a day."

Roger Ebert's review in the Chicago Sun-Times, on the other hand, praised the film's ambition: "It is strange, wonderful, original, and not quite successful. It is just about the first attempt in English to make the sort of personal film Fellini and Godard have been experimenting with in their very different ways. It is not as great as 8½ but it has the same honesty and self-mocking quality."

Collins later cited the film as contributing to her divorce from Newley. In 2006, the movie won a readers' poll in the Chicago Tribune as "The Worst Movie Title Ever."

Songs
The movie songs were released on a record album.
Overture
If All the World's a Stage
Piccadilly Lily
Oh, What a Son of a Bitch I Am
Sweet Love Child
Instrumental
Chalk and Cheese
I'm All I Need
On the Boards
Lullaby
Piccadilly Lily (reprise)
Once Upon a Time
When You Gotta Go
I'm All I Need (reprise)
If All the World's a Stage (reprise)

All of the songs except the instrumental and "Piccadilly Lily" are included in the 2010 CD Newley Discovered.

Awards and honours

References

External links 
 

1969 films
1969 musical comedy films
British musical comedy films
Films shot in Malta
Films with screenplays by Herman Raucher
Universal Pictures films
1969 directorial debut films
1970s English-language films
1960s English-language films
1960s British films
1970s British films